BMC Bhawani Mall is a five storied shopping mall complex located at Saheed Nagar, Bhubaneswar in the state of Odisha, India. The shopping destination is spread over a floor area of six hundred thousand square feet. Publicly opened in 2012, the mall is the second largest mall in Bhubaneswar, following the Esplanade One. The mall has a total commercial space of 600,000 sq ft spread over five floors designed by the Kolkata based, Bhawani Constructions. 
It contains above two hundred outlets, including cafeterias, food courts, restaurants, multiplex, parking space and a hypermarket.

Specifications
100% Power Backup
Fire Fighting System
HVAC and AHU
RCC Framed Earthquake Resistant

Features

Entertainment
Family Entertainment Zones
Multiplex by INOX 3-screen

Leisure
Plaza

Hospitality
Cafeteria
Food Court 
Restaurants

Business
Office Spaces

Others
Departmental Anchors  
Hypermarket

Fire safety measurement 
In 2019, a raid was carried out by Odisha Fire Services department in 10 malls after a major fire at a mall at Damana Square in Bhubaneswar that found several lapses in implementation of adequate fire safety measures.

References

Bhubaneswar